The Virginia Ore Diggers were a minor league baseball team based in Virginia, Minnesota. From 1913 to 1916, Virginia teams played exclusively as members of the Class C level Northern League. The Ore Diggers played home games at Ewens Field.

Baseball Hall of Fame member Rube Waddell played for the 1913 Virginia Ore Diggers.

History
In the spring of 1912, a group of Virginia, Minnesota businessmen organized to secure a professional baseball team for the city. The group entered into negotiations with several other regional cities who established the Central International League. However, Virginia did not gain entry into the league when it formed with four teams for the 1912 season. However, in 1913 an eight–team, Class C level minor league called the Northern League, was proposed that would include the four 1912 Central International League cities and four other franchises. Virginia, Minnesota was admitted into the league.

Minor league baseball play began in Virginia, Minnesota in 1913. The Virginia Ore Diggers became members of the eight-team Class C level Northern League. The Duluth White Sox, Grand Forks Flickertails, Minneapolis, Minnesota, St. Paul Millers, Superior Red Sox, Winnipeg Maroons and Winona Pirates teams joined Virginia in league play.

The Virginia use of the "Ore Diggers" moniker is in reference to the iron ore industry in the region in the era.

The 1913 opening day game at Virginia was postponed twice due to rain. April 23, 1913 was the scheduled as the start of the season, with rain cancelling the game that day and the next. On Friday, April 25, the season opened after the third parade in Virginia in three days. The Ore Diggers lost the opener 5–2 to Winnipeg, with the game shortened to eight innings so the Canadian club could catch its train. Virginia started the season with a 1–6 record at home. On July 17, 1913, in a game at home against Minneapolis, the outfield was full of water. A special ground rule was enacted that any ball hit on the fly into the outfield and not caught was to be a ground rule double.

On May 18, 1913, an aging Rube Waddell joined the Virginia Ore Diggers roster. Waddell was reportedly attracted by the great hunting and fishing reports from nearby Lake Vermillion. Waddell left the team after a July 20, 1913 game, his last professional appearance. Waddell was noted to have regularly played with four bears who would appear at Olcott Park, even naming the bears. Waddell died in 1914.

When Waddell decided to play for Virginia, he reportedly said to reporters,  "There is a great opportunity for the Northern League. The clubs are playing good baseball. Well, I am contented, and I am going to like it fine. I have known Spike Shannon for years. Well, I am off now to play pool."

In their first season of play, the 1913 Virginia Ore Diggers finished in last place in the Northern League standings. With a record of 30–87, the Ore Diggers finished in 8th place, playing under managers Spike Shannon, Bobby Roth and Edward Stewart. Virginia finished 55.5 games behind the 1st place Winona Pirates in the final standings. The Ore Diggers were the last team Hall of Famer Rube Waddell would play for. Reportedly, Waddell had a record of 1–8, appearing in 14 games for Virginia.

Virginia continued play in the eight–team 1914 Northern League. With a final record of 55–68, the team improved to finish in 5th place. The Ore Diggers were managed by Kid Taylor, John Sundheim and Frank McGee and finished 19.0 games behind the 1st place Duluth White Sox in the final regular season standings.

In 1915, the Virginia Ore Diggers finished in 6th place in the final Northern League standings. The Ore Diggers compiled a record of 53–69 to place 6th in the eight–team league. Playing under manager John Sundheim, the Ore Diggers finished 22.5 games behind the 1st place Fargo-Moorhead Graingrowers in the final standings.

The Virginia Ore Diggers played their final season in 1916, folding before the end of the season. The 1916 Northern League opened as a six– team league after the St. Boniface Saints and Grand Forks Flickertails franchises had folded On July 10, 1916, Virginia had a record of 28–32 and had won 11 of their previous 16 games under manager Lefty Davis. On July 10 1916, the Fort William Canadians (22–39) team folded, leaving the league with an uneven five teams. League owners decided another team would be folded and either Virginia or Fargo-Moorhead would be the team. Virginia was folded on July 10, even though the Virginia owners and fans wanted to continue play.

Virginia, Minnesota has not hosted another minor league team.

The ballpark
It was noted the Virginia Ore Diggers played minor league home games at a ballpark site that was later named Ewens Field. Ewens Field was torn down in 2020.

Timeline

Year–by–year record

Notable alumni

Baseball Hall of Fame alumni
Rube Waddell (1913) Inducted, 1946

Notable alumni
Tony Faeth (1913–1915)
Bill McCabe (1915)
Braggo Roth (1913) 1915 AL home run leader
Spike Shannon (1913, MGR)
Bob Wright (1914–1915)

See also
Virginia Ore Diggers players

References

External links
Baseball Reference

Northern League (1902-71) baseball teams
Defunct minor league baseball teams
Baseball teams established in 1913
Baseball teams disestablished in 1916
Defunct baseball teams in Minnesota
Virginia, Minnesota